Goverton  is a village in Nottinghamshire, England in the civil parish of Bleasby(where population details are included).

External links

Villages in Nottinghamshire
Newark and Sherwood